Mutya ng Pilipinas 2018 was the 50th edition of Mutya ng Pilipinas. It was held at the Mall of Asia Arena in Pasay, Metro Manila, Philippines on September 16, 2018. 

At the end of the event, Ilene de Vera crowned Sharifa Akeel as Mutya ng Pilipinas-Asia Pacific International 2018. Including her crowned are the new court of winners: Julieane Fernandez was crowned as Mutya ng Pilipinas Tourism International 2018, Kheshapornam Ramachandran was crowned as Mutya ng Pilipinas Tourism Queen of the Year International 2018, Pauline Amelinckx was crowned as Mutya ng Pilipinas Global Beauty Queen 2018, and Jade Skye Roberts was crowned as Mutya ng Pilipinas Overseas Communities 2018. Mary Justine Teng was named First Runner-Up, while Kristine Malicsi was named Second Runner-Up.

Results
Color keys
  The contestant Won in an International pageant.
  The contestant was a Runner-up in an International pageant.

§ – People's Choice

Special Awards

Major Awards

Sponsor Awards

Contestants

50 contestants competed for the four titles.

Post Pageant Notes
 Sharifa Akeel was crowned as Miss Asia Pacific International 2018.
 Julieanne Fernandez placed 4th runner-up / Dream Girl of the Year International at Miss Tourism International 2018–2019.

References

External links 
 

2018
Mutya ng Pilipinas 2018
2018 in the Philippines